Chiretolpis bicolorata is a moth of the family Erebidae. It is found in Papua New Guinea.

References

Nudariina
Moths of Papua New Guinea
Moths described in 1900